TERS may refer to:
Tip-enhanced Raman spectroscopy
Thermal energy recovery system
Tundra Ecosystem Research Station, Daring Lake, Canada